Selkirkshire was a Scottish county constituency represented in the House of Commons of the Parliament of the United Kingdom from 1708 until 1868, when it was combined with Peeblesshire to form Peebles and Selkirk.

Creation
The British parliamentary constituency was created in 1708 following the Acts of Union, 1707 and replaced the former Parliament of Scotland shire constituency of Selkirkshire.

Boundaries
The constituency covered the whole county of Selkirkshire except for the county town of Selkirk which was represented separately as part of the Lanark Burghs constituency until 1832 when it was combined with Selkirkshire.

History
The constituency elected one Member of Parliament (MP) by the first past the post system until the seat was abolished for the 1868 general election.

  It was combined with Peeblesshire to form Peebles and Selkirk.

Members of Parliament

Election results

Elections in the 1830s

Elections in the 1840s

Pringle was appointed a Lord Commissioner of the Treasury, requiring a by-election.

Pringle resigned after being appointed Clerk of Sesines, causing a by-election.

Elections in the 1850s

Elections in the 1860s
Eliott-Lockhart resigned, causing a by-election.

References 

 History of Parliament: constituencies 

Historic parliamentary constituencies in Scotland (Westminster)
Constituencies of the Parliament of the United Kingdom established in 1708
Constituencies of the Parliament of the United Kingdom disestablished in 1868